Marcus Wilson may refer to:
Marcus W. Acheson (1828–1906), United States federal judge
Marcus Wilson (American football) (born 1968), American running back
Marcus Wilson (basketball), (born 1977), American basketball player
Marcus Wilson (baseball), (born 1996), American baseball player
Marcus Wilson (footballer), (born 2002), Guyanese association football player
Marcus Wilson (Gaelic footballer) (born 1932), Irish Gaelic footballer
Marcus Wilson (producer), television producer on Doctor Who episodes such as "The Almost People"